Jon Vitti is an American writer best known for his work on the television series The Simpsons. He has also written for King of the Hill, The Critic and The Office, and has served as a screenwriter or consultant for several animated and live-action movies, including Ice Age (2002), Robots (2005), and Horton Hears a Who! (2008). He is one of the eleven writers of The Simpsons Movie and also wrote the screenplays for the film adaptions Alvin and the Chipmunks, its "squeakquel" and The Angry Birds Movie.

Career
Vitti is a graduate of Harvard University, where he was president of the Harvard Lampoon along with Mike Reiss. He was also very close with Conan O'Brien while at Harvard. Prior to joining The Simpsons, he had a brief stint at Saturday Night Live, describing his experience on a DVD commentary as "a very unhappy year." After leaving the Simpsons writing staff in its fourth season, Vitti wrote for the HBO series The Larry Sanders Show. Beginning in its seventh season, he was also a writer for The Office.

He is the fifth most prolific writer for The Simpsons. His 25 episodes place him after John Swartzwelder, who wrote 59 episodes, John Frink who has written 33, Tim Long who has written 30, and Matt Selman who has written 29.

Vitti has also used the pseudonym Penny Wise. Vitti used the pseudonym for episodes "Another Simpsons Clip Show" and "The Simpsons 138th Episode Spectacular" because he did not want to be credited for writing a clip show as expressed on Simpsons DVD commentaries (though his name was credited for writing the first Simpsons clip show "So It's Come to This: A Simpsons Clip Show").

On the season four Simpsons episode "The Front," Jon Vitti is caricatured as a Harvard graduate who gets fired from I&S Studios for penning mediocre episodes and gets hit on the head with a name plate by his boss, Roger Meyers.

Personal life
His wife, Ann, is the sister of fellow Simpsons writer George Meyer (who was also a Saturday Night Live writer-turned-Simpsons writer who did not like working on SNL).  He is a distant cousin of Los Angeles Lakers trainer Gary Vitti, award-winning author Jim Vitti, and actor Michael Dante (the stage name of Ralph Vitti).

Writing credits

The Simpsons episodes
He is credited with writing the following episodes:

"Bart the Genius" (1990)
"Homer's Night Out" (1990)
"The Crepes of Wrath" (with George Meyer, Sam Simon, and John Swartzwelder) (1990)
"Simpson and Delilah" (1990)
"Bart's Dog Gets an "F" (1991)
"Lisa's Substitute" (1991)
"When Flanders Failed" (1991)
"Burns Verkaufen der Kraftwerk" (1991)
"Radio Bart" (1992)
"Bart the Lover" (1992)
"Black Widower" (Teleplay) (1992)
"Treehouse of Horror III" (with Al Jean, Mike Reiss, Jay Kogen, Wallace Wolodarsky, and Sam Simon) (1992)
"Mr. Plow" (1992)
"Brother from the Same Planet" (1993)
"So It's Come to This: A Simpsons Clip Show" (1993)
"Cape Feare" (1993)
"Another Simpsons Clip Show" (credited as Penny Wise) (1994)
"Home Sweet Homediddly-Dum-Doodily" (1995)
"The Simpsons 138th Episode Spectacular" (credited as Penny Wise) (1995)
"The Old Man and the Key" (2002)
"Weekend at Burnsie's" (2002)
"Little Girl in the Big Ten" (2002)
"Marge vs. Singles, Seniors, Childless Couples and Teens, and Gays" (2004)
"Simple Simpson" (2004)
"Sleeping with the Enemy" (2004)

The Larry Sanders Show episodes
"Jeannie's Visit"
"Hank's Sex Tape"
"Larry's Sitcom" (Teleplay, with John Riggi)
"Everybody Loves Larry"
"Make a Wish"
Vitti was nominated for Primetime Emmy Awards for Outstanding Writing in a Comedy Series for "Hank's Sex Tape" and "Everybody Loves Larry". He was also credited as co-executive producer for 30 of the 89 episodes.

The Critic episodes
"Dr Jay"
"Siskel & Ebert & Jay & Alice"
"I Can't Believe It's a Clip Show"

King of the Hill episodes
"Jon Vitti Presents: 'Return To La Grunta'"
"Dog Dale Afternoon"
"Rodeo Days"
"Hank's Bad Hair Day"
"Hank's Choice"

The Office episodes
"Viewing Party"
"Garage Sale"

Films
 Ice Age (2002) (story consultant)
 Robots (2005) (consultant)
 The Simpsons Movie (2007) (screenwriter)
 Alvin and the Chipmunks (2007) (screenwriter)
 Horton Hears a Who! (2008) (story consultant)
 Alvin and the Chipmunks: The Squeakquel (2009) (writer)
 The Angry Birds Movie (2016) (screenwriter)

References

External links
 
 Jon Vitti interview

Living people
American television writers
American male television writers
Place of birth missing (living people)
The Harvard Lampoon alumni
Blue Sky Studios people
American people of Italian descent
Year of birth missing (living people)